Live at Rio ArtRock Festival '97 is a live album by Brazilian psychedelic rock band Violeta de Outono, released on May 9, 2000 by Rock Symphony. It was recorded during the band's performance at the Rio ArtRock Festival in Rio de Janeiro, in 1997.

An eponymous DVD containing the footage of the band's performance at the show was released 15 years later.

Track listing

Personnel
 Fabio Golfetti – vocals, guitar
 Cláudio Souza – drums
 Angelo Pastorello – bass
 Fábio Ribeiro – keyboards

References

External links
 Live at Rio ArtRock Festival '97 at Violeta de Outono's official Bandcamp

2000 live albums
Violeta de Outono albums
Portuguese-language live albums